Bobbyjo 
(1990 – 2001) was an Irish bred racehorse by Bustineto and Markup, best remembered as the winner of the 1999 Grand National steeplechase at Aintree. Bobbyjo was owned by Bobby Burke Mullaghmore, Co. Galway.

Humble Beginnings

In 1991, Bobby Burke and his brother Eugene, who was breeding horses himself, met in Galway with businessman and auctioneer Liam Mulryan. They bought six horses from Liam. One was named Bobbyjo and spent the next few years at Eugene's farm in Mullaghmore before being sent for training with Tommy Carberry in July 1995. Bobbyjo  was an Irish bred racehorse by Bustineto and Markup. The name Bobbyjo was created by joining Bobby's name with that of his wife Jo.

Grand National Success

Bobbyjo arrived at Aintree in 1999 having won the Irish Grand National in 1998, however this was not regarded at the time as a good pointer to Grand National success as Irish trained runners had failed to win the race for twenty-four years. On the day Bobbyjo was the subject of a huge gamble that saw him sent off at the short odds of 10/1 with Paul Carberry, the son of the trainer Tommy in the saddle. As coincidence had it, Tommy had been the rider twenty-four years earlier, the last time an Irish trained runner had won the race.

The victory signalled an upturn in fortunes for Irish trained runners in the decade that followed, though he himself completed the course well beaten when defending his crown in 2000.

Death of Bobbyjo

Bobbyjo broke a knee at Fairyhouse Racecourse in February 2001 and had to be put down one month later due to his incurable injuries. In memorial of the horse, a new steeplechase first run at Fairyhouse Racecourse in February 2003 has been named after him.

Pedigree

See also
 Bobbyjo Chase

External links
 Bobbyjo Horse Pedigree

References

1990 racehorse births
2001 racehorse deaths
Racehorses bred in Ireland
Racehorses trained in Ireland
Grand National winners
Thoroughbred family 2-g